Harry Hampton was a recipient of the Victoria Cross.

Harry Hampton may also refer to:
Harry Hampton (footballer, born 1885) (1885–1963), English international footballer
Harry Hampton (footballer, born 1888) (1888–1946), Irish international footballer
Harry Hampton (cricketer), English cricketer
Harry Hampton (golfer) (1889–1965), Scottish-American professional golfer
Harry R. E. Hampton (1897–1980), American journalist and conservationist